The following list includes notable people who were born or have lived in Nashua, New Hampshire.

Academics and writing 

 Jim Collins (born 1965), professor of biological engineering at MIT; MacArthur fellow
 Eliza Hall Kendrick (1863–1930), professor of Biblical studies at Wellesley College
 Hollis Robbins (born 1963), academic, essayist

Business 
Stanley E. Bogdan (1918-2011), founder of S.E. Custom Built, which produced fly reels. 
Samuel A. Tamposi (1924–1995), real estate developer

Inventors 

Ralph H. Baer (1922–2014), inventor of the home video game console, credited with contributing to design of the Simon electronic game
Deepika Kurup (born 1998), inventor of "A Novel Photocatalytic Pervious Composite for Degrading Bacteria in Wastewater", currently a student at Stanford University
Thomas Reardon (born 1969), neuroscientist, creator of Microsoft Internet Explorer, co-founder of CTRL-labs

Arts and media 

 Ernie Anastos (born 1943), news anchorman
 Aurore Chabot (born 1949), ceramic artist
 Decap (born 1984), record producer
 Pamela Gidley (1965–2018), actress, model
 Adam Grandmaison (born 1983), more commonly known as Adam22, podcast host
 Michael Graziadei (born 1979), film and television actor (Daniel Romalotti on The Young and the Restless)
 Randy Harrison (born 1977), actor
 Ray LaMontagne (born 1973), Grammy award-winning singer-songwriter
 Walter Long (1879–1952), actor in films from the 1910s
 Alvin Lucier (born 1931), composer of experimental music and sound installations that explore acoustic phenomena and auditory perception
 Mike Lupica (born 1952), author and former American newspaper columnist, best known for his provocative commentary on sports in the New York Daily News and his appearances on ESPN
 Mandy Moore (born 1984), singer, actress; on March 25, 2019, Moore was awarded a star on the Hollywood Walk of Fame
 Kyle Mosher (born 1985), artist, designer known for his collage and cut-paper style
 Sean Murphy (born 1980), comics artist
 Jared Nathan (1985–2006), actor
 Tim Neverett (born 1966), sportscaster
 Mike O'Malley (born 1966), actor (Yes, Dear and Glee)
 Chris Romano (born 1978), actor Blue Mountain State
 Alexandra Socha (born 1990), Broadway actress
 Brady Watt, producer, bass player, bandleader

Military 

 George P. Estey (1829–1881), Union Army general during the American Civil War
 John G. Foster (1823–1874), Union Army general during the American Civil War
 John Lovewell (1691–1725), colonial militia captain during Dummer's War
 Harry E. Miller Jr. (born ), major general who commanded the 42nd Infantry Division
 Ryan Pitts (born 1985), U.S. Army sergeant who won the Congressional Medal of Honor for heroism during the War in Afghanistan

Politics and law 

 Charles G. Atherton (1804–1853), former U.S. senator
 Kelly Ayotte (born 1968), former U.S. senator and New Hampshire Attorney General
 William A. Crombie (1844–1914), mayor of Burlington, Vermont
 Stephen S. Cushing (1884–1957), Associate Justice of the Vermont Supreme Court
 Jim Donchess, mayor, registered Democrat
 Hugh Gregg (1917–2003), former New Hampshire governor and mayor of Nashua
 Judd Gregg (born 1947), former U.S. senator, member of the Republican Party
Tony Labranche (born 2001), youngest member of the New Hampshire House of Representatives as of 2021
 Roujet D. Marshall (1847–1922), judge on the Wisconsin Supreme Court
 Joshua C. Pierce (1830-1904), Minnesota state legislator and businessman

Sports 

 Ray Dobens (1906–1980), Major League Baseball pitcher who played briefly for the Boston Red Sox during the 1929 season
 Mark Fayne (born 1987), National Hockey League defenseman 
 Jeff Giuliano (born 1979), ice hockey left winger for the Los Angeles Kings
 Jay Heaps (born 1976), soccer defender and former head coach for the New England Revolution in Major League Soccer
 Greg Landry (born 1946), football quarterback; played for the Detroit Lions, Baltimore Colts and Chicago Bears
 Paul LaPolice (born 1970), American and Canadian football player and coach
 Paul Levesque (born 1969), professional wrestler, actor and business executive for the WWE, known by his ring name Triple H
 Kevin McGowan (born 1991), baseball pitcher; has played for the New York Mets
 Jim McNamara (born 1965), baseball catcher; played parts of two seasons in Major League Baseball as a catcher for the San Francisco Giants in 1992–1993
 Ted Phillips, CEO of the National Football League's Chicago Bears
 Kendall Reyes (born 1989), football player
 John Roper (born 1971), baseball pitcher
 Birdie Tebbetts (1912–1999), baseball player, coach, manager of three MLB teams
 Mike Welch (born 1972), baseball pitcher

Other 
 Brian Dugan (born 1956), rapist and serial killer active between 1983 and 1985 in Chicago's western suburbs
 Greggory Smart (?–1990), murder victim of Pamela Smart, an American woman who was convicted of conspiracy to commit murder, witness tampering and accomplice to first degree murder; in 1990, at age 22, Smart was accused of conspiring with her underaged sex partner, then 15-year-old William "Billy" Flynn, and three of his friends to have her 24-year-old husband Greggory Smart killed in Derry, New Hampshire

References

Nashua, New Hampshire
Nashua